The Samsung Galaxy S (retrospectively referred to unofficially as the Samsung Galaxy S1, Galaxy S1 or original Galaxy S) is a touchscreen-enabled, slate-format Android smartphone designed, developed, and marketed by Samsung Electronics; it is the first smartphone of the Samsung Galaxy S series. It is the first device of the third Android smartphone series produced by Samsung.  It was announced to the press in March 2010 and released for sale in June 2010. Due to shortage of Super AMOLED displays, Samsung released a successor to the device called S scLCD or SL and ceased production of the original I9000 model.

The Galaxy S is produced in over two dozen variations. The international 'GT-I9000' reference version features a 1 GHz ARM "Hummingbird" processor, a PowerVR graphics processor, 2 or 4 GB of internal flash memory, a  480×800 pixel Super AMOLED capacitive touchscreen display, Wi-Fi connectivity, a 5-megapixel primary camera and a 0.3-megapixel secondary front-facing camera. Derivative models may include localized cellular radios or changes to button layouts, keyboards, screens, cameras or the Android OS.

At the time of its release, the Galaxy S included the fastest graphical processing of any smartphone, was the thinnest smartphone at 9.9 mm and was the first Android phone to be certified for DivX HD.

As of 2013, over 25 million Galaxy S units have been sold.  The Galaxy S name continued on with the semi-related Snapdragon-based Galaxy S Plus and NovaThor-based Galaxy S Advance smartphones. The next major release of the series was the Samsung Galaxy S II, which was introduced in May 2011.

In 2012, Samsung introduced the dual SIM version of the Galaxy S.

Launch
The phone was initially launched in Singapore on June 4, 2010. Before the end of its first weekend on sale in Singapore, Samsung tweeted that Singtel, the exclusive carrier to sell the device in Singapore, was sold out of devices. On Friday, June 25, 2010, the phone was launched in Malaysia and South Korea. Overall the launch schedule comprised launches on 110 carriers in 100 countries at the same time. U.S. Variants named as Epic, Vibrant, Fascinate, Captivate, and Mesmerize were released from June through September 2010.

Reception
CNET Asia gave the Galaxy S a favorable review with a score of 8.4/10. The Galaxy S was compared to current high-end Android-based phones such as the HTC Desire, Xperia X10, Nexus One, and smartphones using different operating systems like the iPhone 4, which runs iOS, and HTC HD2, which runs Windows Mobile in CNET Asia.

GSMArena.com described the Galaxy S as having "perfect audio quality," claiming the phone's superior all-round performance made it a "new leader of the Android pack."

TIME listed the Galaxy S as #2 device in "Top 10 Gadgets" of 2010, praising its Super AMOLED display.

The phone was criticized by some reviewers for sub-par GPS performance. Anandtech, reviewing the Epic 4G variant, said, "the phone will take an inordinate amount of time to determine your actual location, and/or it won’t pinpoint your location very accurately." Engadget described the GPS in the Vibrant and Captivate variants as "utterly broken and non-functional … this is a problem for which there's no reasonable explanation why it made it all the way to retail devices." Samsung released an application for the Captivate and Vibrant variants only that resets the phone's GPS settings to factory defaults. TechRadar acknowledged GPS faults in the Galaxy S and stated that these have been fixed in the Google Nexus S. There is, however, a solution to the problem and it includes opening it and welding the antenna contacts with the motherboard.

Hardware

Processor
The Samsung Galaxy S used the Samsung S5PC110 processor. This processor combined a 45 nm 1 GHz ARM Cortex-A8 based CPU core with a PowerVR SGX 540 GPU made by Imagination Technologies which supported OpenGL ES 1.1/2.0 and is capable of up to 90 million triangles per second. The CPU core, code-named "Hummingbird", was co-developed by Samsung and Intrinsity. This processor was subsequently renamed to the Samsung Exynos 3110 in October 2011.

Memory
The Samsung Galaxy S has 512 MB of LPDDR1 RAM (Mobile DDR). Some variants also come with either 8 GB or 16 GB of OneNAND memory combined in a package-on-package stack with the processor. An external microSD card slot supports up to 32 GB of additional storage memory.

Screen
The Samsung Galaxy S uses a  Super AMOLED touch screen covered by Gorilla Glass, a special crack and scratch resistant material. The screen is a WVGA PenTile display manufactured by Samsung.

Audio
The phone uses Wolfson's WM8994 DAC as its audio hub.

Camera
Samsung Galaxy S has a 5 megapixel back camera with no optical but digital zoom. It has sensor type 1/3.6" (rectangle 4×3 mm), which is a bit smaller in size than usual sensor in digital compact cameras, which have 1/2.33"-1/2.5" type sensor. It also has a 0.3 megapixel VGA front camera.

GPS
The Samsung Galaxy 'S' was well known for the poor performance of the GPS module. This was due to poor electrical connectivity caused by the use of 'conductive rubber'. Modification of the i9000 to improve GPS performance was a popular hardware modification within the handset hacker community.

Software

User interface

The phone employs the proprietary Samsung TouchWiz 3.0 user interface. Unlike TouchWiz 3.0 on the Samsung Wave, it allows up to seven homescreens. However, different from other Android user interfaces, TouchWiz 3.0 allows users to add, delete and rearrange homescreens. The program launcher is also different from other Android user interfaces in that it has an iOS-like program menu which allows customization of shortcuts. In addition, three of the four shortcuts at the bottom of the screen can also be customized.

The Epic 4G features a specialized version of TouchWiz based on TouchWiz 3.0. Because of the Epic 4G's QWERTY slide-out keyboard, the homescreen needed to be able to rotate into landscape mode. The other Galaxy S TouchWiz 3.0 devices do not support this feature.

The most important aspect of all three generations of TouchWiz is the widget interface. The most prominent widgets that come with the Galaxy S are the Daily Briefing, weather clock and the Buddies Now widget. In addition to Samsung widgets, standard Android widgets can be added and removed from the homescreens.

Bundled applications
Other provided software includes the Layar Reality Browser, a program that visualizes GPS direction, and Aldiko, an ebook reader. The phone also comes with various upgraded versions of software that came with Samsung's previous generation of smartphones (such as i8910HD and i8000 Omnia II).

Media support
The Galaxy S comes with support for many multimedia file formats, including audio codecs (FLAC, WAV, Vorbis, MP3, AAC, AAC+, eAAC+, WMA, AMR-NB, AMR-WB, MID, AC3, XMF), video codecs (mpeg4, H.264, H.263, Sorenson codec, DivX HD/ XviD, VC-1) and video formats (3GP (MPEG-4), WMV (Advanced Systems Format), AVI (divx), MKV, FLV).

Updates

Android 2.2 upgrade

At the time of launch, the Galaxy S had Android 2.1 ("Eclair") installed. An official upgrade to Android 2.2 ("Froyo") began rolling out worldwide in November 2010.

Canada received the 2.2 upgrade for select carriers on December 10, 2010.

According to Samsung the 2.2 upgrade has come to the United States in  2011 for most versions of the handset (AT&T Captivate, Verizon Fascinate, T-mobile Vibrant, Sprint Epic). The 2.2 upgrade was released for T-Mobile on January 20, 2011. It enabled stock Android features that had previously been disabled such as Wi-Fi calling and mobile AP.

Verizon's Fascinate was upgraded to Android 2.2 in April 2011. Verizon's Continuum variant was upgraded to 2.2 in February 2012.

Android 2.3 upgrade
An Android 2.3 ("Gingerbread") update became available for Nordic countries, The Netherlands and Germany on April 16, 2011. The update reached UK, India and Hong Kong by the start of Nov, 2011. Singapore received the update in June. Australia received the update in August. The Samsung Epic for Sprint started receiving the Gingerbread update on November 9, 2011 and the update was released for the Samsung Galaxy S 4G on November 15. As of December 1, 2011, the Samsung Fascinate on Verizon has been updated to Gingerbread 2.3 (Droid-Life).

T-Mobile in the United States made the 2.3 upgrade available on November 15, 2011. Currently, this update is only available on T-Mobile's 4G model (SGH-T959V). T-Mobile USA never produced a 2.3 update for its original Samsung Galaxy S (SGH-T959). The SGH-T959V update is available at their website.
On January 10, 2012, AT&T provided an update to Gingerbread (2.3.5) to the owners of the Captivate (SGH-I897).  The update was possible through a manual update using Kies Mini.

Android 4.0 and later
An official update to Android 4.0 was never released, as Samsung felt that the Galaxy S did not have enough memory (RAM) to run the TouchWiz interface on top of Android 4.0. In lieu of Android 4.0, Samsung released a "Value Pack" update for the Galaxy S in March 2012 in South Korea, which maintains the 2.3 (Gingerbread) -based operating system, but includes new features from TouchWiz 4.0 (some of which are backported from 4.0) such as Face Unlock, improvements to the launcher, the ability to take still photographs while recording video, and a redesigned photo editor.

However, unaffiliated developers associated with CyanogenMod produced unofficial updates based on Android 4.0, 4.1, 4.2, 4.3 and 4.4 for the Galaxy S and its variants. These updates are developed from Android Open Source Project code. LineageOS 14.1, based on Android 7.1, has also been ported to the device.

Unofficial

The device was popular with the software modification community due to the popularity of the handset and supported by CyanogenMod until the demise of the project. The Galaxy S is currently supported by the Replicant Operating System, which, at the moment of writing gives Android 10 capability. In 2017, LineageOS v14.1 (which is CyanogenMod"s successor) based on Android 7.1.2 Nougat, was unofficially ported to XDA.

Variants

International

International versions of the Galaxy S closely resemble the 'GT-I9000' reference version.

GT-I9000B
The Brazilian "GT-I9000B" includes an ISDB-T 1seg digital television tuner with program guide, closed caption and recording support. The units are manufactured locally by Samsung to take advantage of tax cuts associated with local production.

GT-I9000M
The Canadian "GT-I9000M" drops UMTS band VIII support for UMTS band V support.  Bell, Virgin Mobile and SaskTel offer the model.

GT-I9000T
The "GT-I9000T" changes UMTS band VIII support for UMTS band V support.  It is offered by Telcel in Mexico, Telstra in Australia and numerous other carriers throughout Latin America and the Caribbean.

GT-I9000/M8
The "GT-I9000/M8" is the only model to include a quad-band 3G UMTS radio.  It is offered primarily in Australia and New Zealand.

GT-I9003

The "GT-I9003" is a late-model, reduced-cost version of the Galaxy S.  It substitutes the 4-inch Super AMOLED screen with a cheaper 4-inch SuperClear-LCD screen.  It also swaps the Hummingbird SoC with a Texas Instruments OMAP 3630 SoC, which includes the slower PowerVR SGX530 graphics processor and TWL5030 DAC.  To compensate for the increased power draw of the SC-LCD screen, battery capacity is increased from 1,500 to 1,650 mAh.

North America

North American versions of the Galaxy S moderately differ from the "GT-I9000" reference version.  Most use a 4-button layout, drop the FM tuner and front camera, and include UMTS band V support.  A number of models also include 4G support and a physical QWERTY keyboard.

Captivate
AT&T released this variant (SGH-I897) and a slider version of the Captivate called the Captivate Glide for the United States on July 18, 2010, while Rogers released its own variant (SGH-I896) for Canada. Both variants include 16 GB of internal flash memory, but without the front camera, FM radio and LED camera flash present on other Galaxy S variants. Android 2.3 "Gingerbread" is available for this model.  The Rogers version includes minor GPS functionality differences and the ability to use HSUPA.

Vibrant
T-Mobile released this variant (SGH-T959) for the United States on July 15, 2010.  It is the third Android 2.x phone officially supported by T-Mobile (after the Nexus One and MyTouch 3G Slide).  Like the Captivate, it includes 16 GB of internal flash memory, but omits the front camera and FM radio, and lacks an LED camera flash. The SGH-T959 was only updated through Android 2.2.1.

T-Mobile and Wind Mobile also released the closely named Vibrant 4G (SGH-T959V/W) in February 2011.  It adds HSPA+ support and a 1.3-megapixel front-facing camera. Android 2.3 "Gingerbread" is the last version available for this model.

Fascinate
Verizon released this variant (SCH-I500) for the United States on September 9, 2010.  It omits the front camera and FM radio of the base model, but adds a LED flash.  Android 2.3 "Gingerbread" is available.  Its release was accompanied by some controversy over Verizon's decision to replace Google Search with Bing as the primary search engine. With the Gingerbread update, the Bing Search widget was removed and Google Search was restored as the primary search engine. The final version of Android officially released for the Fascinate was 2.3 Gingerbread. 

The SCH-I500 is also known as the Mesmerize for US Cellular and the Showcase for C Spire and Ntelos.

Galaxy S Showcase
Available on Straight Talk/NET10. Similar to the Verizon Fascinate (SCH-I500) but is thinner and lighter.

Epic 4G
Sprint released this variant (SPH-D700) for the United States on August 31, 2010.  It lacks an FM radio, but it includes a LED flash, a message indication LED, a full slide-out QWERTY keyboard and 4G WiMax support.  The included edition of TouchWiz in Android 2.1 had to be reworked to support landscape mode when using the QWERTY keyboard.

Android 2.3 "Gingerbread" is available as an official carrier upgrade, while as of July 2014 it is possible to upgrade to Android 4.4 ("KitKat") with Cyanogenmod.

Stratosphere
The Verizon Stratosphere (SCH-I405) is similar to the Epic 4G.  Main differences are an upgraded 1.3 MP front camera, 4G LTE support and no message LED.  The US Cellular Metrix (SCH-I405U) adds several bands to the LTE support.  All models were released with Android 2.3.

Indulge
The MetroPCS variant (SCH-R910) was released on February 21, 2011, for the United States.  It was the first LTE smartphone at the time of its release.  The Indulge shrinks the screen size from 4 inches to 3.5 inches, removes the front-facing camera, reduces the camera to 3.2 megapixels, removes the flash, lowers the screen resolution 480×320 pixels, and adds a full QWERTY keyboard.  The Cricket model (SCH-R915) lacks LTE support, but adds CDMA 1xEV-DO support over AWS Band IV.

Galaxy Proclaim
Available on Straight Talk/NET10. Similar to the Cricket Indulge (SCH-R915) but lacks the QWERTY keyboard.

Infuse

AT&T released this variant (SGH-I997) for the United States on May 15, 2011, while Rogers released it for Canada on July 26, 2011.  It includes a faster 1.2 GHz version of the Exynos "Hummingbird" SoC, 16 GB of internal flash memory, 8 MP primary camera, 1.3 MP secondary front-facing camera, HSPA+ support and an improved 4.5-inch Super AMOLED+ screen.  AT&T has released an Android 2.3.6 update while Rogers has released 2.3.3.

Aviator
The US Cellular Aviator (SCH-R930) resembles the Infuse 4G, but uses the original 1.0 GHz Hummingbird SoC.  It offers a dual-band CDMA and quad-band LTE radio.

Asia

SC-02B
In Japan, NTT Docomo carries the Galaxy S (SC-02B).  It is similar to the GT-I9000, but omits the front-facing camera.

SHW-M110S
The Galaxy S (SHW-M110S) is an exclusive phone for SK Telecom subscribers.  It differs from the GT-I9000 in that it includes a T-DMB tuner.  It is sold under the "Anycall" branding.

SHW-M130K
KT offers this variant (SHW-M130K) for South Korea as the Galaxy K.  It includes a tri-band UMTS radio, a faster 1.2 GHz Hummingbird SoC, a T-DMB tuner and a smaller 3.5-inch Super AMOLED screen. It is sold under the "Anycall" branding.

SHW-M130L
LG U+ offers this variant (SHW-M130L) for South Korea as the Galaxy U.  It is similar to the Galaxy K, but instead offers a stock 1.0 GHz Hummingbird SoC and a CDMA 1xEV-DO radio.

SCH-I909
China Telecom offers the SCH-I909 variant which supports both GSM and CDMA 2G standards and CDMA 3G.

SCH-I919
China Telecom later offers this more advanced variant, sporting a design almost identical to the AT&T Infuse 4G, a Qualcomm S2 SoC, while retaining support for CDMA 3G.

GT-I9008
China Mobile offers the GT-I9008 variant which supports GSM 2G and TD-SCDMA 3G standards.  It includes a CMMB digital television tuner.  It also uses the OPhone 2.0 platform as opposed to Android.

GT-I9088
China Unicom offers the GT-I9088 variant which supports GSM 2G and UMTS-FDD 3G standards.

Nexus S

The Nexus S is a Galaxy S-derived smartphone co-developed by Google and Samsung in 2010.  The Nexus S differs from the Galaxy S in that it runs a stock version of Android provided by Google as opposed to the TouchWiz edition provided by Samsung and the mobile carriers.  In addition, the Nexus S drops the microSD slot in favor of a NFC transmitter.

Models for the United States, United Kingdom and Canada use a 4-inch Super AMOLED screen similar to the reference Galaxy S, but with a small curvature Google refers to as "Contour Display".  Models for other markets use a 4-inch SuperClear-LCD (SC-LCD) screen.

The Nexus S originally shipped with Android 2.3 "Gingerbread". It can be upgraded to Android 4.1.2 "Jelly Bean".

Legal

In a lawsuit filed on April 15, 2011, Apple accused Samsung of committing patent and trademark infringement with the touchscreen on Samsung Galaxy line of mobile products. That includes the Galaxy S smartphone and the Samsung Galaxy Tab tablet.

See also 
 Comparison of Samsung Galaxy S smartphones
 Samsung Galaxy S series

References

External links
 Official Samsung Galaxy S homepage
 Official Source Code for the Samsung Galaxy S (Sprint Version is SPH-D700 DI18)
 Samsung Apps 
 Samsung Support page
 ARM NEON Multimedia Applications
 CyanogenMod operating system (Alternative Android distribution)

Android (operating system) devices
Discontinued flagship smartphones
Samsung smartphones
Samsung Galaxy
Mobile phones introduced in 2010
Discontinued smartphones
Mobile phones with an integrated hardware keyboard
Mobile phones with user-replaceable battery